Aleksandr Ivanovich Sery (27 October 1927 – 16 October 1987) was a Soviet and Russian film director, known for directing the 1971 comedy film Gentlemen of Fortune.

Upon directing Gentlemen of Fortune, Sery had just come out of prison. Georgiy Daneliya assisted him and wrote the script. Sery used his prison experience to design many situations in the movie, and he also introduced numerous expressions from Russian criminal slang (known as fenya). During filming, it was discovered that he was ill with leukemia, which grew worse and worse during his life.

On 16 October 1987, eleven days before his 60th birthday, he committed suicide by a gunshot.

References

External links
 

1927 births
1987 suicides
High Courses for Scriptwriters and Film Directors alumni
Moscow Aviation Institute alumni
Russian film directors
Soviet film directors
Suicides by firearm in Russia
Suicides by firearm in the Soviet Union